2007–08 season of Argentine football was the 117th season of competitive football in Argentina.

National leagues

Primera División

Apertura champion: Lanús (1st title).
Top scorer:  Germán Denis (18 goals).
Clausura champion: River Plate (33rd title).
Top scorer: Darío Cvitanich (13 goals).
International qualifiers:
2008 Copa Sudamericana: Estudiantes (LP), San Lorenzo, Argentinos Juniors, Independiente.
2009 Copa Libertadores: Lanús, River Plate.
Relegated: Olimpo, San Martín de San Juan.
Source: RSSSF

Primera B Nacional
Champion: San Martín de Tucumán (1st title).
Promoted: San Martín de Tucumán, Godoy Cruz.
Relegated: Almirante Brown, Ben Hur, Nueva Chicago.
Source: RSSSF

Primera B Metropolitana
Champion:  All Boys (2nd title).
Promoted:  All Boys, Los Andes.
Relegated: Defensores de Cambaceres.
Source: RSSSF

Torneo Argentino A
Champion:  Atlético Tucumán (2nd title).
Promoted:  Atlético Tucumán.
Relegated: La Florida, Luján de Cuyo, Sportivo Patria, La Plata FC.
Source: RSSSF

Primera C Metropolitana
Champion:  Colegiales (3rd title).
Promoted:  Colegiales.
Relegated: Sportivo Dock Sud, San Martín de Burzaco.
Source: RSSSF

Torneo Argentino B
Promoted:  Central Córdoba, Alvarado, Patronato, Deportivo Maipú.
Relegated: Athletico Ñuñorco, Tres Algarrobos,  Atlético Maronese, Gimnasia y Esgrima de Santa Fe.
Source: RSSSF

Primera D Metropolitana
Champion:  Defensores Unidos (2nd title).
Promoted:  Defensores Unidos, Berazategui.
Relegated: Muñiz.
Source: RSSSF

Clubs in international competitions

National team
This section covers Argentina's matches from August 1, 2007 to July 31, 2008.

Friendly matches

2010 World Cup qualifiers

References

External links
 AFA
Argentina on FIFA.com

 
Seasons in Argentine football